Bashgyugh is a village in the Ashotsk Municipality of the Shirak Province of Armenia. Statistical Committee of Armenia reported its population was 53 in 2010, down from 68 at the 2001 census.

Demographics

References 

Communities in Shirak Province
Populated places in Shirak Province